Suspects is a British police procedural television series first aired on Channel 5 from 12 February 2014 to 31 August 2016.

Set in London, the series follows DS Jack Weston, DC Charlie Steele and their senior DI Martha Bellamy of the Greater London Police while they investigate different types of cases. Their cases include murders, attempted murders, missing people, drug overdoses, child abuse, and sex crimes.

Most of the show's dialogue is improvised in order to make it seem natural. The actors have a detailed story document and perform from there. The show is filmed within the former London Electricity Building on Cambridge Heath Road, London. The building doubles as Brownall House which features in ITV's comedy series The Job Lot.

Overview 
Suspects is set in a London police station. DS Jack Weston, DC Charlie Steele and DI Martha Bellamy investigate murder cases, missing person's reports, drug overdoses etc. Within every episode a crime is solved in a documentary style. For the second series the concept of the series was changed, so that cases are not resolved in a single episode. The actors don't have a script. The plot is described roughly, and actors improvise the dialogue and their reactions. Through this production style the series should be more realistic and investigative. The series hardly deals with the private lives of the investigators, it is about the police work. An episode is shot within two and a half days, which means that one scene is filmed within only 18 minutes. The main cast prepared for the series by taking a police workshop with a retired police officer for several weeks. They learned interview techniques, police terminologies and general day-to-day lingo.

Cast
 Fay Ripley as Detective Inspector Martha Bellamy (Series 1—4)
 Damien Molony as Detective Sergeant Jack Weston (Series 1—5)
 Clare-Hope Ashitey as Detective Constable Charlotte "Charlie" Steele (Series 1—5)
 Lenora Crichlow as Detective Sergeant/Inspector Alisha Brooks (Series 5)
 Perry Fitzpatrick as Trainee/Detective Constable Gary Roscoe (Series 5)
 James Murray as Detective Chief Inspector Daniel Drummond (Series 5)
 Vauxhall Jermaine as CID James Tanner (Series 1)
 Jack Greenlees as Justin Marecroft (Series 1-2)

Episodes

Series 1 (2014)
The complete first series was released on DVD on 1 September 2014.

Series 2 (2014)
The second series consisted of 4 episodes, arranged as two 2-part stories, with each story being originally shown on consecutive days in the same week.

Series 3 (2015)
A third series aired in January 2015.

Series 4 (2015)
A fourth series began broadcasting weekly on Wednesday 25 November 2015. It consists of four stand-alone episodes.

Series 5 (2016)
A fifth series of the show aired in 2016 without main cast member Fay Ripley, who, due to her filming commitments for the new series of Cold Feet, was unable to reprise her role as DI Martha Bellamy. Bellamy is found dead, having been fatally shot, in the first episode of the series. Three new cast members were introduced to the main cast with the initial premise of investigating her murder. Lenora Crichlow stars as DS Alisha Brooks, James Murray stars as DCI Daniel Drummond, and Perry Fitzpatrick stars as TDC Gary Roscoe. For the first time in the series history, all six episodes focus on one ongoing story, entitled The Enemy Within.

Dutch and German Remakes 
In October 2016 it was announced that Suspects would be getting a German remake. The company UFA will produce the remake for RTL Television.

In March 2017 a Dutch remake of Suspects was released in the Netherlands on Videoland, produced for RTL Netherlands.

References

External links
 
 
 Suspects at Channel5.com
 The Telegraph: Suspects is a home-grown drama of note
 Express: The latest suspects to tackle a police show: New drama challenges old format

2014 British television series debuts
2016 British television series endings
2010s British police procedural television series
Channel 5 (British TV channel) original programming
English-language television shows
Television series by Fremantle (company)
British detective television series
Television shows set in London